The 13th annual Genie Awards were held on November 22, 1992, and honoured Canadian films released in late 1991 and 1992. They were dominated by the Canadian/British/Japanese co-production Naked Lunch.

The ceremony was held at the Metro Toronto Convention Centre in Toronto. The ceremony was originally slated to be hosted by John Candy, but he pulled out in a dispute over advance advertising which he perceived as making fun of his weight; Leslie Nielsen instead stepped in as host.

Nominations were announced on October 13.

Nominees and winners
The Genie Award winner in each category is shown in bold text.

References

External links 
Genie Awards 1992 on imdb 

13
Genie
Genie